The 2005–06 Air21 Express season was the fourth season of the franchise in the Philippine Basketball Association (PBA).

Key dates
August 14: The 2005 PBA Draft took place in Sta. Lucia East Grand Mall, Cainta, Rizal.

Draft picks

Roster

Fiesta Conference

Game log

|- bgcolor="#bbffbb"
| 1
| October 7
| Purefoods
| 88-86
| Ritualo (17)
| 
| 
| Ynares Center
| 1–0
|- bgcolor="#edbebf"
| 2
| October 12
| Talk 'N Text
| 91–109
| Ritualo (23)
|  
| 
| Ynares Center 
| 1–1
|- bgcolor="#edbebf"
| 3
| October 16
| Red Bull
| 77–84
| Daniels (23)
| 
| 
| Araneta Coliseum
| 1–2
|- bgcolor="#edbebf"
| 4
| October 21
| Alaska
| 108–111 (2OT)
| Daniels (24)
| 
| 
| Araneta Coliseum
| 1–3 
|- bgcolor="#bbffbb"
| 5
| October 23
| Sta. Lucia
| 110-95
| Daniels (30)
| 
| 
| Araneta Coliseum
| 2–3
|- bgcolor="#edbebf"
| 6
| October 29
| San Miguel
| 119–123 (2OT)
| De Ocampo (21)
| 
| 
| Roxas City
| 2–4

|- bgcolor="#bbffbb"
| 7
| November 4
| Talk 'N Text
| 90-88
| Ritualo (17)
| 
|  
| Ynares Center
| 3–4
|- bgcolor="#edbebf"
| 8
| November 6
| Brgy.Ginebra
| 83–93
| Ferriols (22) 
| 
| 
| Araneta Coliseum
| 3–5
|- bgcolor="#bbffbb"
| 9
| November 11
| San Miguel
| 90-86
| Daniels (22) 
| 
| 
| Araneta Coliseum
| 4–5
|-bgcolor="#bbffbb"
| 10
| November 16
| Alaska
| 88-83
| David (28)
| 
| 
| Araneta Coliseum
| 5–5
|-bgcolor="#bbffbb"
| 11
| November 20
| Sta.Lucia
| 114-103
| Daniels (24)
| 
| 
| Cuneta Astrodome
| 6–5
|-bgcolor="#edbebf"
| 12
| November 23
| Coca Cola
| 106–115
| Ritualo (31)
| 
| 
| Araneta Coliseum
| 6–6

|-bgcolor="#bbffbb"
| 13
| December 10
| Brgy.Ginebra
| 109-101
| Daniels (30)
| 
| 
| Ormoc City
| 7–6
|-bgcolor="#edbebf"
| 14
| December 14
| Red Bull
| 
| 
| 
| 
| Cuneta Astrodome
| 7–7
|-bgcolor="#bbffbb"
| 15
| December 16
| Coca Cola
| 98-94
| De Ocampo (28)
| 
| 
| Cuneta Astrodome
| 8–7
|-bgcolor="#bbffbb"
| 16
| December 18
| Purefoods
| 110-109
| Ritualo (22)
| 
| 
| Ynares Center
| 9–7

Transactions

Pre-season

Trades

Additions

Subtractions
{| cellspacing="0"
| valign="top" |

References

Barako Bull Energy seasons
Air21